The Cross River is a short river that rises within the hamlet of Cross River in the town of Lewisboro in southern New York state. Its headwaters make a loop, heading S, then SW, then NW, and finally West. It continues a few miles in that direction until it joins a tendril of the Cross River Reservoir, a part of the New York City water supply system.

A part of both the Croton River watershed and the system's Croton Watershed, it flows out of the reservoir's spillway then joins the Croton River in Katonah.

The short stretch of river that begins at the spillway outlet and continues on to the river's entry into the Muscoot Reservoir is an early spring trout fishery.

See also
 List of New York rivers

References

Croton Watershed
Rivers of Westchester County, New York
Tributaries of the Hudson River
Rivers of New York (state)